GEA World S.p.A. is a consultancy company with offices in Rome, Dubai and London, operating in sports business industry. Alessandro Moggi is its president in partnership with Franco Zavaglia, Riccardo Calleri and Ivan Vecchietti. In January 2013, after several years of athlete management, Gea World S.p.A. dramatically changed direction. It does not manage players, instead offering consultations within sport systems, event organization, image management, marketing and corporate social responsibility. Within a short period of time, Gea World has earned a high importance role being a top consultant of international corporations and star football clubs. Gea World has also developed projects in co-operation with scientific associations. On January 22, 2014, at the Chamber of Deputies in Rome, Gea World launched Gea Tutor, a mentoring support service for athletes with the goal of helping them to transition in both their personal and professional lives as their public careers comes to a close. Since may 2022 helping the continuing of gea world alessandro moggi’s son, Luciano Lorenzo Moggi , nephew of former juventus sporting director Luciano Moggi started working in the agency as well.

References

External links
 

Sports management companies
Sports event promotion companies